Bryan Henare (born 24 September 1974 in Auckland, New Zealand) is a former professional rugby league footballer.

Playing career

Auckland Rugby League
An Otahuhu Leopards junior, Henare toured Great Britain in 1993 with the Junior Kiwis and he represented a New Zealand President's XIII in 1996. Henare also toured with the New Zealand Māori rugby league team in 1995. Henare played in the Lion Red Cup in 1995 for the Auckland Warriors colts side. Early on in his career Henare attracted interest from the Wigan Warriors but eventually opted to remain in Auckland.

National Rugby League
Henare played for the Auckland Warriors, making their first grade squad in 1996. He played in 22 games for the club, although a serious knee injury hampered his 1998 season.  In 1999 Henare represented Auckland South in the National Provincial Competition.

Super League
Henare moved to England, signing with St. Helens (Heritage № 1097) at the start of the 2000 season. Having won the 1999 Championship, St. Helens contested in the 2000 World Club Challenge against National Rugby League Premiers the Melbourne Storm, with Henare playing at second-row forward in the loss. He was with the club for two years before moving to the Oldham Bears (Heritage № 1119) in 2002, initially on loan.

Henare then moved to the Leigh Centurions at the start of 2003.

References

External links
Players profile at rugbyleague.co.nz
Saints Heritage Society profile
VODAFONE WARRIORS 1995-2008 (PLAYER ROSTER)
SL stats

1974 births
Living people
Auckland rugby league team players
Featherstone Rovers players
Junior Kiwis players
Leigh Leopards players
New Zealand Māori rugby league players
New Zealand Māori rugby league team players
New Zealand rugby league players
New Zealand Warriors players
Oldham R.L.F.C. players
Otahuhu Leopards players
Rugby league hookers
Rugby league players from Auckland
Rugby league second-rows
St Helens R.F.C. players